Moreno Giovanni Blom (born 24 October 2001) is a Dutch professional darts player who currently plays in World Darts Federation (WDF) and Professional Darts Corporation (PDC) events. He is a Hungarian Classic Champion.

Career
Blom was fourteen when he started his adventure with darts. During the first period of his career, he played only in local tournaments. As part of the local team, he plays with Jermaine Wattimena. In 2020, he took part in international PDC Development Tour tournaments for the first time. In late September, he threw the nine-dart finish during the second round match against Brian Raman. He competed in the 2020 PDC World Youth Championship. In the Group Stage, he beat his fellowmen Levy Frauenfelder and Maikel Verberk, and advanced to second round. He defeated Joshua Richardson in the knockout phase match and finally lost to Jeffrey de Zwaan in the third round.

After the season ended, he participated in online tournaments where he was once caught during cheating. In the next season, he took part in the PDC Challenge Tour and PDC Development Tour tournaments several times, but without success. No qualifications for the PDC World Youth Championship made Blom change his career strategy and switch to playing in the World Darts Federation (WDF) tournaments. Already at the beginning of 2022, during the Slovak Masters, he was advanced to the final of the tournament, but lost to Neil Duff by 2–5 in legs. He took part in the 2022 Dutch Open in June, but was eliminated in the fourth round despite being seeded.

At the end of October, he won Hungarian Classic. This is his first international tournament won. He defeated Benjamin Pratnemer in the final by 5–3 in legs. By this achievement, he securing debut in the 2023 WDF World Darts Championship and qualified for the 2022 Winmau World Masters.

Controversies
In December 2020, Blom has been caught on cheating during an online darts tournament. Footages show that Blom throws a dart in the board after having a bounce out with the same dart earlier and he also submitted incorrect scores during the match. Blom admitted the allegations afterwards. The tournament organizer decided to put Blom out of the tournament and disqualified for every next tournament of that platform. This situation did not entail any additional consequences.

World Championship results

WDF
 2023:

Performance timeline

References

2001 births
Living people
Dutch darts players